Allium parciflorum is a plant species known only from the islands of Corsica and Sardinia in the Mediterranean. It is common at all elevations on those two islands but unknown elsewhere.<ref>[http://luirig.altervista.org/flora/taxa/index1.php?scientific-name=allium+parciflorum Altervista Flora Italiana, Aglio paucifloro, Allium parciflorum']</ref>Allium parciflorum has egg-shaped bulbs. Scape is up to 25 cm tall, round in cross-section. Leaves are thin and tubular, about the same length as the scape but withering before flowering time. Umbels have very few bell-shaped flowers. Tepals are white to pale lavender with prominent dark purple midveins.Flora di Sardegna, plantae endemicae, Allium parciflorumActa Plantarum, Galleria della Flora italiana, Allium parciflorum Viv. color photos, captions in ItalianAllium parciflorum is closely related to Allium lojaconoi'', endemic to Malta.

References

parciflorum
Onions
Flora of Corsica
Flora of Sardinia
Plants described in 1824